Suleyman Karaman (born 1956 in Refahiye, Erzincan) is a Turkish politician, who was a former General Manager and chairman of the Board of Directors of Turkish State Railways (TCDD) and Deputy General Manager of Istanbul transportation authority (IETT).

Footnotes

1956 births
Living people
People from Erzincan
Istanbul Technical University alumni